Webster v. Daly, 163 U.S. 155 (1896), was a United States Supreme Court case in which the Court held that the Supreme Court does not have jurisdiction over cases appealed from the circuit courts. The case was dismissed.

This case is related to Brady v. Daly. They arose from the same set of copyright infringement disputes regarding Under the Gaslight by Augustin Daly.

The United States abolished the circuit court system involved in Webster v. Daly in 1912. The modern analog would be the district courts.

References

External links
 

1896 in United States case law
United States copyright case law
United States Supreme Court cases
United States Supreme Court cases of the Fuller Court